Michał Adamuszek (born 29 April 1986) is a Polish handball player for NMC Górnik Zabrze and the Polish national team.

References

1986 births
Living people
People from Dąbrowa Górnicza
Polish male handball players
Vive Kielce players
21st-century Polish people